Krishna Kulasekaran (born 14 February 1978) credited as Krishna is an Indian actor who mainly appears in Tamil cinema.

He is the younger brother of Tamil film director Vishnuvardhan.

Early life
Krishna's father is film producer K.K.Sekar (Pattiyal Sekar) and his brother is noted film director, Vishnuvardhan. He went to St. Bede's Anglo Indian Higher Secondary School in Chennai, studied at Loyola College and graduated with an MBA in finance in the United States. He worked for a year and a half in the IT industry and started his own business that was doing well. He has also undergone training in Jazz and worked as a dancer/choreographer before he left for US.

Career
As an actor, he first faced the camera for Mani Ratnam's Anjali  and later appeared in Iruvar and Santosh Sivan's The Terrorist. He was also chosen to play the younger version of Rajinikanth's character in Thalapathi, but the character was later scrapped because it affected the film's length. He also starred in small role with Udhaya (2004).

He played his first lead role in Alibhabha, which was produced by his father. The film met with favourable reviews, but was not a commercial success. After his first film, he wanted to do a gangster film based on a true incident in North Madras, called Madras to be directed by Five Star Krishna, but it was shelved because of misunderstandings between the director and the producer. His next two films Kattradhu Kalavu (2010)  and Kazhugu (2012) were also produced by his father. In Kazhugu he played someone who recovers bodies of suicide victims who jump off a cliff. It received positive response.

After appearing in a brief role in Vallinam (2014), he starred in RS Infotainment's horror comedy Yaamirukka Bayamey (2014). His next films were  Vanavarayan Vallavarayan (2014) and Vanmam (2014). In 2015, he starred in action comedy Yatchan directed by his brother Vishnuvardhan. In 2017, he made his comeback including four thriller releases with Yaakkai, Pandigai, Nibunan  and Vizhithiru. In 2018, he appeared in Veera, Kalari and Maari 2. He acted in Kazhugu 2 (2019), sequel to the 2012 film, Kazhugu. However, the film came out of mixed reviews.

Filmography

Films as actor

Films as producer

References

External links
 

Male actors from Mumbai
Tamil male actors
Living people
Indian male film actors
Male actors in Tamil cinema
1978 births